The Territory Wildlife Park is a zoo at Berry Springs in the Northern Territory of Australia, some  (about a 45 minutes drive) south of Darwin. It opened in 1989.  Situated on 400 ha of natural bushland, it contains native animals and plants representative of Northern Territory, and especially Top End tropical monsoonal, environments. It contributes to their conservation through research programs as well as through public education.  The three main habitats represented are woodland, wetland and monsoon vine forest.

The Territory Wildlife Park is a member of the Zoo and Aquarium Association (ZAA).

Fauna

The many species of animals are kept in the park in various exhibit precincts including: 'Aquarium'; 'Billabong'; 'Monsoon Forest Walk'; 'Nocturnal House'; 'Oolloo Sandbar'; 'Paperbark Walk'; 'Rocky Ridge'; 'Walk-through Aviary' and 'Woodland Walk'. The species include:

Birds

Australasian grebe
Australian pelican
Bar-shouldered dove
Beach stone-curlew
Black-breasted buzzard
Blue-faced honeyeater
Blue-winged kookaburra
Bush stone-curlew
Bush thick-knee
Channel-billed cuckoo
Chestnut-breasted mannikin
Comb-crested jacana
Common koel
Crimson finch
Dollarbird
Emerald ground dove
Emu
Figbird
Forest kingfisher
Gouldian finch
Green pygmy goose
Hooded parrot
Jabiru
Long-tailed finch
Partridge pigeon
Pheasant coucal
Pied imperial pigeon
Radjah shelduck
Rainbow pitta
Red-collared lorikeet
Rose-crowned fruit dove
Southern boobook
Spangled drongo
Tawny frogmouth
Tiwi masked owl
Varied Lorikeet
Wedge-tailed eagle
White-bellied cuckoo-shrike
White-breasted woodswallow
White-throated honeyeater
Yellow oriole

Fish

Archerfish
Barred grunter
Banded rainbowfish
Barcoo grunter
Barramundi
Beach-rock mangrove goby
Bigfin mudskipper
Black catfish
Blackmast (Strawman)
Blue devil
Blueback blue-eye
Blue-green chromis
Chequered rainbowfish
Coal grunter
Diamond mullet
Dwarf rainbowfish
Estuary cod
Exquisite rainbowfish
Fly-specked hardyhead
Freshwater whipray
Giant glassfish
Giant gudgeon
Gulf saratoga
Hyrtl's catfish
Indo-Pacific tarpon
Lorentz's grunter
Mangrove jack
Moorish idol
Mouth almighty
Pikey bream
Poreless gudgeon
Primitive archerfish
Rendahl's catfish
Reticulated glassfish
Sailfin glass perchlet
Shadow goby
Sharpnose grunter
Sooty grunter
Spangled grunter
Spotted blue-eye
Spotted scat
Starry pufferfish
Threadfin rainbowfish
Western clownfish
Western gobbleguts
Whitetail squirrelfish
Wilson's mangrove goby
Yellowfin surgeonfish

Frogs
Giant snapping frog
Magnificent tree frog

Invertebrate

Flame-backed fiddler crab

Mammals

Agile wallaby
Antilopine kangaroo
Bare-rumped sheathtail bat
Black flying fox
Black wallaroo
Common planigale
Dingo
Ghost bat
Golden bandicoot
Grassland melomys
Narbalek
Northern brown bandicoot
Northern brushtail possum
Northern quoll
Rakali
Rock ringtail possum
Short-beaked echidna
Short-eared rock-wallaby
Spectacled hare-wallaby
Sugar glider

Reptiles

Black-headed python
Brown tree snake
Children's python
Darwin carpet python
Estuarine crocodile
Freshwater crocodile
Frilled lizard
Giant cave gecko
Golden tree snake
Hosmer's spiny-tailed skink
King brown snake
Merten's water monitor
Northern blue-tongued skink
Northern death adder
Northern red-faced turtle
Northern snake-necked turtle
Northern snapping turtle
Northern spiny-tailed gecko
Northern yellow-faced turtle
Olive python
Pig-nosed turtle
Rough knob-tailed gecko
Water python
Western brown snake

See also
 List of zoos in Australia

References

External links

1989 establishments in Australia
Zoos established in 1989
Zoos in the Northern Territory
Biological research institutes in Australia
Parks in the Northern Territory
Wildlife parks in Australia